For the parent molecule 9,10-anthraquinone, see anthraquinone

Anthraquinones (also known as anthraquinonoids) are a class of naturally occurring phenolic compounds based on the 9,10-anthraquinone skeleton.  They are widely used industrially and occur naturally.

Occurrence in plants 

Natural pigments that are derivatives of anthraquinone are found, inter alia, in aloe latex, senna, rhubarb, and cascara buckthorn, fungi, lichens, and some insects. A type II polyketide synthase is responsible for anthraquinone biosynthesis in the bacterium Photorhabdus luminescens. Chorismate, formed by isochorismate synthase in the shikimate pathway, is a precursor of anthraquinones in Morinda citrifolia.
Tests for anthraquinones in natural extracts have been established.
Senna glycosides from the senna.
Frangulin in Frangula alnus.
Aloe-emodin in aloe resin.
Carmine, a bright-red pigment derived from insects.
Hypericin and fagopyrin are naphthodianthrones, anthraquinone-derivatives.

Applications

In the production of hydrogen peroxide
A large industrial application of anthraquinones is for the production of hydrogen peroxide. 2-Ethyl-9,10-anthraquinone or a related alkyl derivative is used, rather than anthraquinone itself.

Millions of tons of hydrogen peroxide are manufactured by the anthraquinone process.

Pulping
Sodium 2-anthraquinonesulfonate (AMS) is a water-soluble anthraquinone derivative that was the first anthraquinone derivative discovered to have a catalytic effect in the alkaline pulping processes.

Dyestuff precursor

The 9,10-anthraquinone skeleton occurs in many dyes, such as alizarin. Important derivatives of 9,10-anthraquinone are 1-nitroanthraquinone, anthraquinone-1-sulfonic acid, and the dinitroanthraquinone.

Medicine

Derivatives of 9,10-anthraquinone include many important drugs including the anthracenediones and the  anthracycline family of chemotherapy drugs. The latter drugs are derived from the bacterium Streptomyces peucetius, discovered in Italy a soil sample near the Adriatic sea. Drugs in the anthraquinone family include the prototypical daunorubicin, doxorubicin, mitoxantrone, losoxantrone, and pixantrone.  Most of these drugs, with the notable exception of pixantrone, are extremely cardiotoxic, causing irreversible cardiomyopathy, which can limit their practical usefulness in cancer treatment.

The anthracenediones also include
Antimalarials such as rufigallol
DNA dyes / nuclear counterstains such as DRAQ5, DRAQ7 and CyTRAK Orange for flow cytometry and fluorescence microscopy.
Anthraquinone derivatives: rhein, emodin, aloe emodin, parietin (physcion), and chrysophanol extracted from Cassia occidentalis are toxic and known to cause hepatomyoencephalopathy in children.

Dantron, emodin, and aloe emodin, and some of the senna glycosides have laxative effects. Prolonged use and abuse leads to melanosis coli. 5 anthraquinones have been shown to inhibit the formation of Tau aggregates and dissolve paired helical filaments thought to be critical to Alzheimer's disease progression in both mouse models and in vitro testing but have not been investigated as a therapeutic agent.

References 

 

it:Antrachinoni